The Devil Within may refer to:
 The Devil Within (manga) by Ryo Takagi
 The Devil Within (1921 film), a 1921 American film directed by Bernard J. Durning
 The Devil Within (2010 film), a 2010 American film directed by Tom Hardy

See also
 The Evil Within (disambiguation)